Union Township is one of twenty townships in Benton County, Iowa, USA.  As of the 2000 census, its population was 996.

Geography
According to the United States Census Bureau, Union Township covers an area of 35.88 square miles (92.92 square kilometers).

Cities, towns, villages
 Van Horne

Adjacent townships
 Big Grove Township (north)
 Eden Township (northeast)
 Eldorado Township (east)
 St. Clair Township (southeast)
 Leroy Township (south)
 Iowa Township (southwest)
 Kane Township (west)
 Homer Township (northwest)

Cemeteries
The township contains these two cemeteries: Bender and Calvary Catholic.

Major highways
  U.S. Route 30

School districts
 Benton Community School District

Political districts
 Iowa's 3rd congressional district
 State House District 39
 State Senate District 20

References
 United States Census Bureau 2007 TIGER/Line Shapefiles
 United States Board on Geographic Names (GNIS)
 United States National Atlas

External links

 
US-Counties.com
City-Data.com

Townships in Benton County, Iowa
Cedar Rapids, Iowa metropolitan area
Townships in Iowa